Bill Hurley (born June 15, 1957) is a former American football player. Hurley attended Syracuse University, where he was the starting quarterback on the Syracuse Orange football team. Hurley was drafted by the Pittsburgh Steelers in the fourth round of the 1980 NFL Draft, and converted to playing safety. He later played for the New Orleans Saints and Buffalo Bills.

References

1957 births
Living people
Buffalo Bills players
New Orleans Saints players
Pittsburgh Steelers players
St. Joseph's Collegiate Institute alumni
Syracuse Orange football players